The Anchorage Glacier Pilots are a college summer baseball team in Anchorage, Alaska in the United States. They are part of the Alaska Baseball League, and a member of the National Baseball Congress. 

The Pilots have won the NBC World Series in 1969, 1971, 1986, 1991 and 2001. They were formed in 1969. Team colors are royal blue and white.

Home games are played at Mulcahy Stadium, in Anchorage.

From 1970 to 1972, the Glacier Pilots were a member of the Big West Conference, along with the Alaska Goldpanners, Humboldt Crabs, Grand Junction Eagles, and Bellingham Bells.

Pat Doyle, a member of the team Hall of Fame, managed the team in 1990 and 1991.

Future major leaguers who have played for the Glacier Pilots include Mark McGwire, Rick Aguilera and Roy Smalley III.

References

External links
 Anchorage Glacier Pilots home page

1969 establishments in Alaska
Alaska Baseball League
Amateur baseball teams in Alaska
Sports in Anchorage, Alaska
Baseball teams established in 1969